Cymothoe is a genus of butterflies in the subfamily Limenitidinae, the admirals and relatives. They are known commonly as gliders. The genus is distributed in the Afrotropical realm, where species are found mainly in forest habitat.  mainly in the Guinean Forests of West Africa and the Congolian forests.

Description
These are medium-large to large-size (wingspan 40-70 millimetres) often quite colourful butterflies. Species in this genus exhibit a number of different colours and patterns. Among the most remarkable are a number of species where the upperside is solid coloured bright red or orange. Another group is largely pale yellow; others deep ochreous yellow and chocolate brown or pure white.

Biology
The larvae feed on various shrubs and trees. Recorded host genera include Rawsonia and Kiggelaria  (Achariaceae), Fernandoa  and Kigelia  (Bignoniaceae), Vismia  (Hypericaceae), Dovyalis  (Salicaceae) and Rinorea  (Violaceae). The adults spend most of their time in the canopy but also seek out sunlit spots between the trees and feed on decaying vegetation on the forest floor.

Taxonomy
These butterflies exhibit sexual dimorphism. Individuals can also be variable within a species, especially females. The females of C. caenis, for example, are so variable that authorities have described 20 different forms of the species based on their differences.

The sister genus is Harma. The type species of the genus is Papilio althea Cramer.

Species groups
Defining species groups is a convenient way of subdividing well-defined genera with a large number of recognized species. Cymothoe species are so arranged in assemblages called "species groups" but (not superspecies, but an informal phenetic arrangement). These may or may not be clades. As molecular phylogenetic studies continue, lineages distinct enough to warrant some formal degree of recognition become evident and new groupings are suggested, but consistent ranking remains a problem.

Species
There are about 75 known species.

Listed alphabetically within species groups:
The oemilius species group
Cymothoe oemilius (Doumet, 1859)
The hyarbita species group
Cymothoe hyarbita (Hewitson, [1866])
Cymothoe reinholdi (Plötz, 1880)
The lucasi species group
Cymothoe egesta (Cramer, 1775)
Cymothoe lucasii (Doumet, 1859)
Cymothoe megaesta Staudinger, 1889
Cymothoe owassae Schultze, 1916
Unknown species group
Cymothoe orphnina Karsch, 1894
The lurida species group
Cymothoe colmanti Aurivillius, 1898
Cymothoe hypatha (Hewitson, 1866)
Cymothoe lurida (Butler, 1871)
Unknown species group
Cymothoe cyclades (Ward, 1871)
Cymothoe fontainei Overlaet, 1952
Cymothoe heliada (Hewitson, 1874)
Cymothoe herminia Grose-Smith, 1887
Cymothoe hesiodina Schultze, 1908
Cymothoe hesiodotus Staudinger, 1889
Cymothoe howarthi Rydon, 1981
Cymothoe isiro Rydon, 1981
Cymothoe ochreata Grose-Smith, 1890
Cymothoe sassiana Schouteden, 1912
Cymothoe weymeri Suffert, 1904
The fumana species group
Cymothoe fumana (Westwood, 1850)
Cymothoe haynae Dewitz, 1886
Unknown species group
Cymothoe althea (Cramer, [1776])
Cymothoe amenides (Hewitson, 1874)
Cymothoe capella (Ward, 1871)
Cymothoe caprina Aurivillius, 1897
Cymothoe consanguis Aurivillius, 1896
Cymothoe coranus (Grose-Smith, 1889)
Cymothoe eris Aurivillius, 1896
The caenis species group
Cymothoe alcimeda (Godart, [1824])
Cymothoe alticola Libert & Collins, 1997
Cymothoe caenis (Drury, [1773])
Cymothoe jodutta (Westwood, 1850)
Cymothoe teita van Someren, 1939
Unknown species group
Cymothoe adela Staudinger, 1889
Cymothoe altisidora (Hewitson, 1869)
Cymothoe amaniensis Rydon, 1980
Cymothoe angulifascia Aurivillius, 1897
Cymothoe aubergeri Plantrou, 1977
Cymothoe aurivillii Staudinger, 1899
Cymothoe beckeri (Herrich-Schäffer, [1853])
Cymothoe collarti Overlaet, 1942
Cymothoe collinsi Rydon, 1980
Cymothoe cottrelli Rydon, 1980
Cymothoe dujardini Viette, 1971
Cymothoe indamora Hewitson, 1866
Cymothoe lambertoni Oberthür, 1923
Cymothoe magambae Rydon, 1980
Cymothoe melanjae Bethune-Baker, 1926
Cymothoe vumbui Bethune-Baker, 1926
Cymothoe zenkeri Richelmann, 1913
Cymothoe zombana Bethune-Baker, 1926
The sangaris species group
Cymothoe anitorgis (Hewitson, 1874)
Cymothoe aramis (Hewitson, 1865)
Cymothoe coccinata (Hewitson, 1874)
Cymothoe euthalioides Kirby, 1889
Cymothoe harmilla (Hewitson, 1874)
Cymothoe hobarti Butler, 1900
Cymothoe magnus Joicey & Talbot, 1928
Cymothoe ogova (Plötz, 1880)
Cymothoe sangaris (Godart, 1824)
Unknown species group
Cymothoe arcuata Overlaet, 1945
Cymothoe crocea Schultze, 1917
Cymothoe distincta Overlaet, 1944
Cymothoe excelsa Neustetter, 1912
Cymothoe haimodia (Grose-Smith, 1887)
Cymothoe hartigi Belcastro, 1990
Cymothoe mabillei Overlaet, 1944
Cymothoe meridionalis Overlaet, 1944
Cymothoe preussi Staudinger, 1889
Cymothoe radialis Gaede, 1916
Cymothoe rebeli Neustetter, 1912
Cymothoe reginaeelisabethae Holland, 1920

References

External links
Seitz, A. Die Gross-Schmetterlinge der Erde 13: Die Afrikanischen Tagfalter. Plate XIII 34 et seq.
Cymothoe types Royal Museum for Central Africa images
Images representing Cymothoe at EOL
Images representing Cymothoe at Consortium for the Barcode of Life

 
Limenitidinae
Nymphalidae genera
Taxa named by Jacob Hübner